Martinique is not a separate territory but a region of France. France has a multi-party system, with numerous parties in which no one party often has a chance of gaining power alone, and parties must work with each other to form coalition governments.

For further details see the article: Politics of France.

The parties

Most of the French political parties are active in Martinique.

In addition there are a number of regional parties:

 Martinican Independence Movement (Mouvement Indépendantiste Martiniquais, MIM)
 Martinican Progressive Party (Parti Progressiste Martiniquais, PPM)
 Build the Martinique Country (Batir le Pays Martinique)
 Martinican Communist Party (Parti Communiste Martiniquais, PCM) close to PCF
 Péyi-A, affiliated with NUPES

Local factions of French parties

 Socialist Federation of Martinique (Fédération socialiste de Martinique, FSM) close to PS
 Worker's Combat (Combat Ouvrier, CO) close to Workers' Struggle

See also
 Lists of political parties

+Martinique
Martinique
Political parties